Meeza (ميزة) is an Egyptian electronic payment systems provider for domestic transactions within Egypt. It is supported by the Egyptian government and is regulated by the Egyptian Central Bank and the national Egyptian Banks Company (EBC). Meeza provides similar electronic payment services as MasterCard and Visa but can only be used locally inside Egypt. The name Meeza means "advantage" in Egyptian Arabic.

History
Meeza was established in early 2019, to provide a national payment scheme supporting a cashless society in Egypt. By the end of 2019, Meeza has issued about 4 million payment cards for use within the Egyptian network.

In October 2020, Meeza started offering free prepaid cards to Egyptians, which can be used locally and can not be used outside Egypt.

Products and services
Meeza produces bank cards and mobile wallet applications for local transactions within Egypt. Meeza payment cards are accepted in merchandise stores and government organizations across Egypt, in addition to online Egyptian e-commerce websites. Meeza issues both prepaid payment cards and bank account debit cards. The cards are issued by most of the major banks in Egypt like National Bank of Egypt (NBE), Banque Misr, Alex Bank, Banque du Caire, Commercial International Bank (CIB), and other Egyptian banks. The Meeza card products also include contactless cards for point-of-sale outlets supporting them.

See also
 Payment service provider
 E-commerce payment system

References

External links
 Official website

Telecommunications companies of Egypt
Financial services companies established in 2019
Egyptian_brands
Credit cards
Credit card issuer associations
Contactless smart cards
Online payments
2019 establishments in Egypt
Companies based in Cairo